Epilepia dentatum is a species of snout moth in the genus Epilepia. It is known from Japan (the type location is Kyoto) and Taiwan.

References

Moths described in 1927
Epipaschiinae
Moths of Japan
Taxa named by Shōnen Matsumura